Addia Kathryn Wuchner (born June 8, 1955, in Kentucky) is an American politician and nurse who served as a Republican member of the Kentucky House of Representatives for the 66th district from 2005 to 2019.

Education
Wuchner attended Bellarmine University and Pontifical Athenaeum Regina Apostolorum before earning an RN degree from the University of Louisville.

Elections
2012 Wuchner was challenged in the three-way May 22, 2012 Republican primary, winning with 1,995 votes (52.9%) and was unopposed for the November 6, 2012 general election, winning with 17,272 votes.
2004 When District 66 Representative Charlie Walton ran for Kentucky Senate and left the seat open, Wuchner won the 2004 Republican primary with 1,919 votes (62.6%) and was unopposed for the November 2, 2004 general election, winning with 15,137 votes.
2006 Wuchner was unopposed for both the 2006 Republican primary and the November 7, 2006 general election, winning with 8,673 votes.
2008 Wuchner was unopposed for both the 2008 Republican primary and the November 4, 2008 general election, winning with 16,864 votes.
2010 Wuchner was unopposed for both the May 18, 2010 Republican primary and the November 2, 2010 general election, winning with 11,080 votes.
2011 When Democratic state auditor Crit Luallen left the position open, Wuchner ran in the 2011 Republican primary, but lost to John Kemper, who lost the November 2011 general election to Democratic nominee Adam Edelen.

References

External links
Official page at the Kentucky General Assembly
Campaign site

Addia Wuchner at Ballotpedia
Addia Kathryn Wuchner at the National Institute on Money in State Politics

1955 births
Living people
American nurses
American women nurses
Bellarmine University alumni
Republican Party members of the Kentucky House of Representatives
Miami University alumni
People from Florence, Kentucky
University of Louisville alumni
Women state legislators in Kentucky
21st-century American politicians
21st-century American women politicians